Edmonton-Highlands was a provincial electoral district in Alberta, Canada, mandated to return a single member to the Legislative Assembly of Alberta using the first past the post method of voting from 1971 to 1993 and again from 1997 to 2004.

History

Representation history
The district's first representative was PC David Thomas King. He served in the cabinet of Peter Lougheed, most notably as Education minister from 1979 until 1986.

King was defeated by New Democrat Pam Barrett in the 1986 election. She served two terms as MLA, and took a break from politics due to poor health at the same time the riding was dissolved in 1993.

However, another quick redistribution saw the riding re-created in 1997, and Barrett (now leader of the NDP) captured the riding again. She subsequently resigned her seat in 2000 after a near-death experience.

Brian Mason won the resulting by-election, and was re-elected in 2001. When the riding was abolished again in 2004, he went on to serve as MLA for Edmonton-Highlands-Norwood.

Election results

1970s

		

|}

	
		
		
				

				

|}

		
				

				

|}

1980s

		
				

				

|}

		
				

				

|}

		
				

	

|}

1990s
Results for 1997 are compared to results in Edmonton-Highlands-Beverly in 1993.
	

		
				

		
		
|}

2000s

See also
List of Alberta provincial electoral districts

References

Further reading

External links
Elections Alberta
The Legislative Assembly of Alberta

Former provincial electoral districts of Alberta